This is a list of awards and prestigious honors received by Bob Hope throughout his career.

Academy Awards

Honors
 Recipient of the Golden Plate Award of the American Academy of Achievement in 1961
 Induction into the National Association of Broadcasters Hall of Fame (for Radio) in 1977
 Recipient of the Kennedy Center Honors in 1985
 Induction into the Television Hall of Fame in 1987
 Induction into the World Golf Hall of Fame in 1983
 Recipient of the Arkansas Traveler
Induction into Omicron Delta Kappa, the National Leadership Honor Society in 1992

Medals

 Congressional Gold Medal (June 8, 1962)
 Sylvanus Thayer Award, United States Military Academy (at West Point, 1968)
 Presidential Medal of Freedom (awarded by Lyndon B. Johnson, January 20, 1969)
 Medal for Merit (awarded by Gen. Dwight D. Eisenhower, Chief of Staff, at Pentagon October 24, 1946. “Decoration was in recognition of his wartime contributions to morale on the homefront as well as on virtually every war front.”)
 Department of Defense Medal for Distinguished Public Service (at Naval Air Station, North Island, San Diego, Ca., Jan. 31, 1971)
 Medal of Liberty (1986, one of twelve recipients)
 National Medal of Arts (1995)
 Ronald Reagan Freedom Award (1997)
 Spirit of Hope Award (first honorary, 1997)

Titles and designations
 1948 World Series Champion (as part owner of the Cleveland Indians).
 Honorary mayor of Palm Springs, California (1950s)
 Hasty Pudding Man of the Year (first awardee, 1967)
 Board of Governors of the National Space Institute, forerunner of the present-day National Space Society, a nonprofit educational space advocacy organization founded by Dr. Wernher von Braun (1974)
 Honorary Veteran of the United States Armed Forces, a tribute from the United States Congress given in recognition of the entertainment he provided U.S. troops during war and peacekeeping missions (October 29, 1997)
 Honorary Knight Commander of the Order of the British Empire (KBE) In recognition of his contributions to film, to song, and to the entertainment of troops in the past. (1998). He had previously been appointed an Honorary Commander of the Order of the British Empire (CBE) in 1976.
 Knighthood, Order of St. Sylvester from the Vatican
 Silver Buffalo Award (highest adult award given by the Boy Scouts of America)
 The Honorable Order of Kentucky Colonels.
 The Grand Order of Water Rats.
 Appointed a Knight Commander with Star of the Order of St. Gregory the Great by Pope John Paul II in 1998
 Hope became the 64th and only civilian recipient of the United States Air Force Order of the Sword on June 10, 1980. The Order of the Sword recognizes individuals who have made significant contributions to the enlisted corps.
 In 1996 Hope was awarded the Naval Heritage Award by the U S Navy Memorial Foundation for his support of the US Navy and military.

Memorials and tributes
 The PGA Tour's Bob Hope Chrysler Classic, which was an existing tournament (The Desert Classic) renamed in recognition of the comedian's lifelong passion for the game, 1966
 The Lorain-Carnegie Bridge in Cleveland was renamed the Hope Memorial Bridge in 1983 (disputed as to whether it was meant to honor Hope, his stonemason father Harry, or the entire Hope Family)
 America's Tribute to Bob Hope, a 1988 documentary taped at the Palm Desert, California, Bob Hope Cultural Center 
 In 1992, a Golden Palm Star on the Palm Springs, California, Walk of Stars was dedicated to him.
 Bob Hope Drive, streets in both Burbank (where there is also an airport named after him) and Rancho Mirage, California. The Rancho Mirage street is the location of Eisenhower Medical Center which Hope and his wife were instrumental in creating.

 The United States Air Force named a C-17 Globemaster III transport aircraft the Spirit of Bob Hope.
 Bob Hope: 50 Years of Hope, an exhibition of Hope's service of entertaining the United States military at the National Museum of the United States Air Force near Dayton, Ohio 
 Bob Hope Square (naming of the intersection at Hollywood and Vine in Los Angeles to commemorate Hope's 100th birthday, May 29, 2003)
 Memory Lane-Bob Hope Way (renaming of East 14th Street in  Cleveland to commemorate Hope's 100th birthday in 2003)
 Bob Hope Airport: Hope had joked with his family that he wanted an airport named for him after hearing in 1979 that Orange County officials had renamed their airport after John Wayne. On November 3, 2003 the Burbank-Glendale-Pasadena Airport Authority voted unanimously to rename the facility and on November 18, 2003 the Glendale, and Burbank city councils voted unanimously to approve it. Pasadena followed on December 10. The FAA three-letter designation BUR did not change. A rededication ceremony took place on December 17, the 100th anniversary of the Wright brothers' first powered flight.
 The historic Fox Theater in downtown Stockton, California, was renamed the Bob Hope Theater in his honor. The building is listed on the National Register of Historic Places.
  of the U.S. Military Sealift Command was named after the performer in 1997. It is one of very few U.S. naval ships that were named after living people.
 Asteroid 2829 Bobhope
 The Bob Hope Theatre, an amateur theatre (although professional musicians receive payment) in Eltham, London, where he was born. He personally funded the theatre in 1980 to develop further projects for the venue.
 Blue plaque at 44, Craigton Road Eltham, London, Hope's place of birth.
 The Bob Hope Theatre, an on-base movie theatre and lecture hall at Marine Corps Air Station Miramar, San Diego, California.
 Hope had a long and close association with Southern Methodist University in Dallas. His donations of over $800,000 enabled the opening of the Bob Hope Theatre in the Owen Fine Arts Center of the Meadows School of the Arts, and two theater scholarships and an award are named in his honor.
 "The Bob Hope Chow Hall", the dining facility at Camp Lemonnier, Djibouti, Africa.
 Bob Hope Primary School, a primary school located on Kadena US Air Force Base, in Okinawa, Japan.
 The historic Bob Hope Patriotic Hall building on Figueroa Street in Los Angeles County was named in his honor on August 3, 2003, by the Los Angeles County Board of Supervisors.
 In a bill passed by Congress in 2008, the research library at the Ellis Island Immigration Museum was renamed the Bob Hope Memorial Library.
 At the U.S. Naval Academy, Alumni Hall is home to the Bob Hope Performing Arts Center.
 In 2009 "A National Salute to Bob Hope and the Military" was dedicated in San Diego, California.

Stars on the Hollywood Walk of Fame
 For contributions to the live theater, radio, motion picture, and television, Hope was honored with four stars on the Hollywood Walk of Fame.
 Motion picture star at 6541 Hollywood Blvd.
 Radio star at 6141 Hollywood Blvd.
 TV star at 6758 Hollywood Blvd.
 Live theatre special plaque at 7021 Hollywood Blvd.

Golden Globe Awards

 Special Achievement Award 1958 "For an Ambassador of Good Will."
 Cecil B. DeMille Award 1963

Honorary Degrees
Bob Hope Received more than 50 Honorary Degrees, These Include

Polls
 In a 2005 poll to find "The Comedian's Comedian", he was voted amongst the top 50 comedy acts ever by fellow comedians and comedy insiders.
 In 1996 TV Guide ranked Hope number 25 on its "50 Greatest TV Stars of All Time" list.

References

Sources 
 
 
 

Hope, Bob
awards